Michael James Weaver (born April 12, 1991) is an American professional golfer who finished 64th at the 2013 U.S. Open as an amateur.  Weaver was also runner-up at the 2012 U.S. Amateur.

Results in major championships

CUT = missed the half-way cut

U.S. national team appearances
Amateur
Palmer Cup: 2013 (winners)
Walker Cup: 2013 (winners)

References

External links
Cal Bears profile

American male golfers
California Golden Bears men's golfers
Sportspeople from Fresno, California
1991 births
Living people